Chambers Lake is a lake in the U.S. state of Washington.

Chambers Lake has the name of the local Chambers family which settled the area in the 1840s.

References

Lakes of Thurston County, Washington